Club Atlético Racing (usually referred as Racing de Córdoba) is an Argentine football club from the city of Córdoba. The team currently plays in Federal A, the regionalised third division of the Argentine football league system.

History
Racing was founded in the Nueva Italia district of Córdoba on 14 December 1924. Its most successful season came in 1980 when the team finished 2nd in the Nacional championship, after losing the final matches at the hands of Rosario Central, with scores of 1–5 and 2–0 respectively (3–5 on aggregate).

At the end of the 2005–06 season the club narrowly missed out on promotion to the Primera B Nacional. Racing had to play San Martín de Tucumán in the Clausura final. After the game ended with an aggregate score of 3–3, the decision went to a penalty shootout which Racing lost 7–6.

Titles

National
 Torneo Federal A (1): 2022
Torneo Argentino A (3): 1999, 2003–04
Torneo Argentino B (1): 1999

Regional
 Liga Cordobesa de Fútbol (Primera División) (9): 1962, 1965, 1967, 1980, 1981, 1994, 1995, 2004 Apertura, 2004 Clausura
 Liga Cordobesa de Fútbol (Segunda División) (1): 1934
 Liga Cordobesa de Fútbol (Tercera División) (1): 1925
 Torneo Neder Nicola (2): 1973, 1981
 Copa Córdoba (1): 1981
 Copa Desafío Córdoba (1): 2008
Copa "Sesentenario" Sunchales (1): 2008

International
 President's Cup (1): 1981

References

External links

 
Association football clubs established in 1924
Football clubs in Córdoba Province, Argentina
1924 establishments in Argentina